Mártir de Cuilapán    is one of the 81 municipalities of Guerrero, in south-western Mexico. The municipal seat lies at Apango.  The municipality covers an area of 499.8 km2.

Before the Spanish conquistadors arrived, the area was known as Coixcas.

As of 2005, the municipality had a total population of 15,272.

References

Municipalities of Guerrero